Netball at the 1999 South Pacific Games in Santa Rita, Guam was held from 29 May to 12 June 1999.

Results

Pool games

Round 1

Round 2

Bronze Medal match

Gold Medal match

Final standings

See also
 Netball at the Pacific Games

References

1999 Pacific Games
South Pacific Games
Netball at the Pacific Games